Lisa-Jane Taouma  is a Samoan New Zealand writer, film and television director, and producer.

Background 
Taouma grew up Faleasiu and Tulaele in Samoa and migrated to Auckland, New Zealand. She has an MA (1st Hons) from the University of Auckland and lectures there on Pacific arts; the title of her 1998 master's thesis was Re-picturing paradise : myths of the dusky maiden.

Taouma is married to fellow writer and comedian Mario Gaoa.

Career 
Taouma began writing for the screen in 1996, for Tala Pasifika, specifically the episodes Brown Sugar and Talk of the Town. She began working on Tagata Pasifika as a reporter and senior director.

In 2014 she launched Polynesian online community Coconet. and produces a number of programmes for television including the popular 'Fresh TV' for TVNZ. In 2018 she made the award winning documentary 'Marks of Mana' winning best documentary at the ImagineNative festival in Toronto 2018, Best Cinematography at DocEdge Festival in Aotearoa 2019. 

Taouma has curated a number of exhibitions and written for scholarly publications on representation of Polynesia in art. In 2002, as part of the Asia Pacific Triennial of Contemporary Art she curated Pasifika Divas, an interdisciplinary performance-based project at the Queensland Art Gallery.

In the 2009 Qantas Film and Television Awards Taouma was nominated in the Best Children's/Youth Programme category for her work on Polyfest '09. Taouma received the Special Recognition Awards at the 2015 Arts Pasifika Awards. In the 2023 New Year Honours, she was appointed an Officer of the New Zealand Order of Merit, for services to Pacific arts and the screen industry.

Filmography

References

External links 
 The Coconet

Living people
University of Auckland alumni
Samoan emigrants to New Zealand
New Zealand women film directors
New Zealand film producers
New Zealand television writers
People from A'ana
Women television writers
Year of birth missing (living people)
New Zealand women film producers
Officers of the New Zealand Order of Merit